William Charles Hay (born December 9, 1935) is a Canadian former ice hockey centre who played eight seasons in the National Hockey League (NHL) for the Chicago Black Hawks. After his playing career, he served as the CEO of the Calgary Flames. He was inducted into the builder category of the Hockey Hall of Fame in 2015, and was named to the Order of Hockey in Canada in 2021.

Playing career
Hay started his junior career with the Regina Pats in the Western Canadian Junior Hockey League in 1952–53. He would then move on to play for the Saskatchewan Huskies in 1953–54 before returning to the Pats in 1954–55. Hay and the Pats would make it all the way to the Memorial Cup that year where they would lose in 5 games to the Toronto Marlboros.

In 1955–56, Hay moved to Colorado to play with the Colorado College Tigers. He received many awards during his stay in Colorado which saw him being named to the WCHA First All-Star Team twice, the NCAA First All-Star Team twice and a berth to the NCAA Championship All-Tournament Team in 1956–57.

In 1958–59, Hay started his pro career with the Calgary Stampeders. In 53 games he recorded 24 goals and 54 points. In 1959–60, Hay made his first National Hockey League appearance with the Chicago Black Hawks. In his rookie season he put up a total of 55 points and was awarded the Calder Memorial Trophy and a spot on the 1960 NHL All-Star Game roster. In 1960–61, Hay and the Black Hawks made a trip to the Stanley Cup Finals. Paired on a line with Bobby Hull and Murray Balfour, the trio helped the Black Hawks claim their first Stanley Cup since 1937–38. Hay would play 6 more seasons, all with the Black Hawks, before retiring.

Hockey executive career
Hay became the President and CEO of the Calgary Flames in 1991. He held the positions until being named the Chairman of the Hockey Hall of Fame in Toronto, Ontario.

Personal life
He is the son of Hockey Hall of Fame member Charles Hay and the nephew of Earl Miller.

Awards and honours
Selected to the NCAA Championship All-Tournament Team in 1957.
Calder Memorial Trophy winner in 1960.
Played in 1960 and 1961 NHL All-Star Games.
Stanley Cup champion in 1961.
Inducted into Hockey Hall of Fame in the Builder Category, 2015.

On February 26, 2021, Hay was named to the Order of Hockey in Canada by Hockey Canada, in recognition of his career and contributions to the game in Canada.

Career statistics

Regular season and playoffs

References

External links
 

1935 births
Living people
AHCA Division I men's ice hockey All-Americans
Calder Trophy winners
Calgary Flames executives
Canadian expatriate ice hockey players in the United States
Canadian ice hockey centres
Chicago Blackhawks players
Colorado College Tigers men's ice hockey players
Hockey Canada presidents
Hockey Hall of Fame employees
Hockey Hall of Fame inductees
Ice hockey people from Saskatchewan
National Hockey League team presidents
NCAA men's ice hockey national champions
Order of Hockey in Canada recipients
Regina Pats players
Saskatchewan Huskies ice hockey players
Stanley Cup champions